A' is a Japanese-language pop album by Osaka-based band Afrirampo, released in 2004 of Acid Mothers Temple's label, containing previously self-released tracks and alternate versions of tracks which originally appeared on the bands A release. The tracks were produced by Kawabata Makoto and digitally remastered by Yoshida Tatsuya of Ruins.

The album was released as an Enhanced CD containing a video of live performance clips and a band photo, and was limited to 1000 copies.

Track listing

Personnel

 Oni – vocal, guitar
 Pikacyu – vocal, drums

Technical personnel

 Produced by Afrirampo
 Executive produced by Kawabata Makoto

References

2004 albums
Afrirampo albums
Self-released albums